Euphaedra nigrobasalis is a butterfly in the family Nymphalidae. It is found in the Democratic Republic of the Congo, Zambia and Malawi. The habitat consists of primary forests.

Subspecies
Euphaedra nigrobasalis nigrobasalis (Democratic Republic of the Congo, northern Zambia)
Euphaedra nigrobasalis ceramica Hecq, 1991 (Malawi)
Euphaedra nigrobasalis upemba Overlaet, 1955 (Democratic Republic of the Congo)

References

Butterflies described in 1921
nigrobasalis